Enter the Future is the fourteenth studio album by La Mafia, released on March 4, 1990. It entered at number seven on the Latin regional Billboard charts and by July it reached number four. In July 2017 it was announced that a re-mastered version of the album will be available in digital platform on August 4, 2017.

Track listing

References

1990 albums
La Mafia albums
Spanish-language albums